The 1909 Drexel Dragons football team was coached by Corson.

Schedule

Roster

References

Drexel
Drexel Dragons football seasons
Drexel Dragons football